Gorenje pri Zrečah is a settlement in the Municipality of Zreče in northeastern Slovenia. The area is part of the traditional region of Styria. It is now included with the rest of the municipality in the Savinja Statistical Region.

Name
The name of the settlement was changed from Sveta Kunigunda (literally, 'Saint Cunigunde') to Gorenje, and then again to Gorenje pri Zrečah in 1955. The name was changed on the basis of the 1948 Law on Names of Settlements and Designations of Squares, Streets, and Buildings as part of efforts by Slovenia's postwar communist government to remove religious elements from toponyms.

Church
The local church, dedicated to Saint Cunigunde, is the parish church of the Parish of Saint Cunigunde on Pohorje (Archdiocese of Maribor). It dates to the late 14th century with extensive rebuilding in the 17th century.

References

External links
Gorenje pri Zrečah at Geopedia

Populated places in the Municipality of Zreče